Ghand Katrin Amol Futsal Club is an Iranian professional futsal club based in Amol. It currently plays in the Iranian Futsal Super League

Players

Current squad

Personnel

Current technical staff

Last updated: 29 August 2022

Managers

Last updated: 29 August 2022

References

External links
 Official Website

Futsal clubs in Iran
Sport in Amol